Jeonnam Stadium (전남야구장) is a stadium in Hampyeong, South Korea.  Kia Tigers, the home stadium of the two groups had been used in 2006–11.

Jeonnam Stadium aging facilities are difficult to maintain and will cost in 2010 the Kia Tigers an investment of 200 billion transform it into a new look.

See also
Hampyeong Kia Challengers Field

Baseball venues in South Korea
Sport in South Jeolla Province
Kia Tigers
Hampyeong County
Buildings and structures in South Jeolla Province